The Cispadane Republic was a short-lived client republic located in northern Italy, founded in 1796 with the protection of the French army, led by Napoleon Bonaparte. In the following year, it was merged with the Transpadane Republic (formerly the Duchy of Milan until 1796) to form the Cisalpine Republic. The Cispadane Republic was the first Italian sovereign State to adopt the Italian tricolour as flag.

History

On 16 October 1796, a congress was held in Modena after the ruler, Duke Hercules III, had fled to Venice to escape the French advance. The congress was formed by representatives from the provinces of Modena, Bologna, Ferrara and Reggio Emilia, all located south of the Po. 

The congress was unofficially organized by Napoleon, whose French army had swept through northern Italy earlier in the year, and who needed to settle the situation in Italy and gather new troops for an offensive against Austria. 

The congress proclaimed that the four provinces would form the Repubblica Cispadana: a civic guard, composed of mounted hunters and artillery, was formed. In the 7 January 1797 session, in Reggio Emilia, the congress decided to form a government. 

The flag, the first tricolor in Italy, was a horizontal tricolour, with red (top), white and green stripes. In the center was an emblem composed of a quiver, accolade to a war trophy, with four arrows that symbolized the four provinces forming the Republic, all within a crown of bay. The Cispadane Republic was the first Italian sovereign State to adopt the Italian tricolour.

On 29 June 1797, the Cispadane Republic united with the Transpadane Republic to form the Cisalpine Republic.

Citations

References

See also
 Historical states of Italy
 French client republic

1796 in Italy
1796 establishments in Italy
1797 disestablishments in Italy
Client states of the Napoleonic Wars
Italian states
Former republics
States and territories established in 1796
States and territories disestablished in 1797